Memurutindene is a chain of mountains in the Memurutind massif in Norway. It is located in Lom Municipality in Innlandet county.

Four peaks form the highest parts of the chain:
Store Memurutinden which reaches  at the highest point
Austtoppen which reaches  at its highest point
Vestre Memurutindane which reaches  at its highest point
Austre Memurutinden which reaches  at its highest point 

The mountains surround a glacier field called Austre Memurubrean, and to the south of Vestre Memurutinden is another glacier called Vestre Memurubrean, and to the north of the massif lies the large Veobreen glacier.

See also
List of mountains of Norway by height

References

Jotunheimen
Lom, Norway
Mountains of Innlandet